Loggins is a surname. Notable people with the surname include:

Crosby Loggins, American singer-songwriter
Dave Loggins, singer, songwriter and musician
Kenny Loggins, American singer and songwriter
Leroy Loggins, former professional basketball player

See also
 Loggins and Messina, American rock-pop duo
 Sam Loggin (born 1977), English actress